The Calhoun Farmhouse is a historic house located at 2575 LA 821, about  west of Ruston, Louisiana, USA.

Built around 1880 on a parcel owned by Mrs. John D. Calhoun, the house is a frame residence in Italianate style. Around 1890, a rear kitchen service wing was added, transforming the L-shaped building into an U-shaped one. A few minor alterations were made in 1952 and 1960, which included the enclosure of rear galleries and the addition of a carport which is considered a non-contributing structure.

The house was listed on the National Register of Historic Places on May 3, 1982.

See also
 National Register of Historic Places listings in Lincoln Parish, Louisiana

References

Houses on the National Register of Historic Places in Louisiana
Houses completed in 1880
Italianate architecture in Louisiana
Lincoln Parish, Louisiana
National Register of Historic Places in Lincoln Parish, Louisiana